Janine Sherman Barrois is an American television writer, producer, and showrunner. In 2017 she began executive producing and showrunning Claws on TNT.

Career
Janine Sherman Barrois is a writer and showrunner under an exclusive multi-year deal with Warner Bros. to create and develop new series. Barrois was an Executive Producer on all four seasons of Claws, the TNT dramedy starring Niecy Nash, and was the Showrunner for the first three seasons. In addition, she was the Co-Showrunner and Executive Producer of Self Made: Inspired by the Life of Madam CJ Walker, the Netflix limited series starring Oscar-winning actress Octavia Spencer. Currently, Barrois is the Creator/Showrunner of The Kings of Napa, a drama about an influential family who runs one of the most prestigious Black-owned vineyards in the world. The show premieres on Oprah Winfrey’s OWN network at the beginning of 2022.  Barrois has numerous other projects in various stages of development at Showtime, Apple and HBOMax.

Barrois made her directorial debut with French Fries, a short she wrote as part of Refinery29's Shatterbox Anthology series, in conjunction with TNT, and with support from the Women at Sundance program. French Fries went on to win the short film category at the Crested Butte Film Festival.   
Previously, Barrois spent five years as an Executive Producer on the CBS series Criminal Minds. Prior to that, she was an Executive Producer on the Warner Bros. ER, where she worked on the show's final four seasons. Before ER, Barrois spent five seasons on Third Watch, rising from Story Editor to Co-Executive Producer. She has also written on Eddie Murphy's The PJs, The Jamie Foxx Show, and Lush Life. Barrois is a graduate of the Warner Bros. Writers Workshop and attended Howard University.

In 2021, Barrois won an NAACP Image Award for Outstanding Television Movie, Mini-Series, or Dramatic Special for Self Made: Inspired by the Life of Madam CJ Walker. In 2018, Barrois won the NAACP Image Award for Outstanding Writing in a Comedy Series for her episode of Claws entitled "Batshit" and was nominated the following year for another Claws episode. Before that, she won for Outstanding Writing in a Dramatic Series for an episode of Criminal Minds and the Humanitas Award for her writing on ER. Additionally, Barrois is active in the WGA, where she serves in their Mentoring Program as a judge for their Writers' Access Project and on the committee for the showrunner training programs.

As a former board member of the Santa Monica Museum of Art (ICA LA) and The William H. Johnson Foundation, Barrois is a collector of and advocate for African-American art.

Filmography

Writer

References

External links
 

American television producers
American television writers
American women television producers
American women television writers
Living people
Place of birth missing (living people)
Year of birth missing (living people)
21st-century American women